Abdul Mannan (born 14 August 1988) is a Pakistani former cricketer. He played eleven first-class and sixteen List A matches for several domestic teams in Pakistan between 2006 and 2014.

See also
 List of Attock Group cricketers

References

External links
 

1988 births
Living people
Pakistani cricketers
Attock Group cricketers
Faisalabad cricketers
Faisalabad Wolves cricketers
Sargodha cricketers
People from Sargodha District